Truthdig is an American alternative news website that provides a mix of long-form articles, blog items, curated links, interviews, arts criticism and commentary on current events delivered from a politically progressive, left-leaning point of view. The site offers independent journalism and focuses on major "digs" that purport to  look beneath headlines to reveal facts overlooked or not reported by mainstream media. As of 2014, the Truthdig site drew over 400,000 visitors per month. Truthdig was co-founded in 2005 by Zuade Kaufman and Robert Scheer, who served as editor in chief.

Origins 
Kaufman got her first job in journalism at KCET in Los Angeles and worked in documentaries before moving to print journalism. She worked with Scheer at the Los Angeles Times’  hyperlocal editions Westside Weekly and Our Times as a researcher and then as a reporter. When the newspaper changed owners and the local editions were cut, Kaufman went on to get her masters in journalism at the University of Southern California Annenberg School for Communications. She began developing an online news site while still a student and she and Scheer launched Truthdig the year she graduated and right after Scheer was pushed out of the Los Angeles Times.

Contributors 
Significant contributors have included Noam Chomsky, Juan Cole, Gore Vidal, Sam Harris, Chris Hedges, Amy Goodman, Greg Palast, Carrie Rickey, and animator Mark Fiore.

In October 2006, Truthdig published a 660-word essay titled "After Pat's Birthday" about NFL player and American soldier Pat Tillman's death written by his brother Kevin. The essay was widely distributed and was cited in The New York Times and the Associated Press.

On the tenth anniversary of the Iraq War, Truthdig published "The Last Letter" by Tomas Young, a veteran paralyzed in Iraq, in which he addresses George W. Bush and Dick Cheney and condemns them as war criminals. The letter, written as Young awaited his death under hospice care, was translated into several languages and printed worldwide.

Communication studies 
Truthdig has been used as a data source in communication studies research on systematic differences in coverage of political events by alternative media (such as Truthdig) versus mainstream media. Truthdig has also been included in a set of news sources subjected to statistical analysis intended to identify credible sources.

Awards 
As of October 2017, Truthdig has won six Webby Awards, including four regular Webbys and two Webby People's Voice Awards. In 2007, it won both a regular Webby and a Webby People's Voice Award. At the 2010 ceremony for the Webby Awards, which traditionally limit acceptance speeches to five words, Robert Scheer accepted on behalf of Truthdig, saying: "Wall Street—what fucking thieves."

Truthdig and its individual journalists have won numerous awards from the Los Angeles Press Club, including 11 Southern California (SoCal) Journalism Awards in 2017, three in 2013, and five in 2010. The 11 SoCal awards from 2017 included three first-place awards, in the categories "Editorial Cartoon", "Investigative", and "Political Column/Commentary—Election". The three SoCal awards from 2013 included one first-place award, in the category "Website, News Organization, Exclusive to the Internet". The five SoCal awards from 2010 included four first-place awards, in the categories "Online Journalist", "Online Column/Commentary/Criticism", "Online Sports News/Feature/Commentary", and "Website, Exclusive to the Internet—Budget over 10K".

As of October 2017, Truthdig journalists have won three Sigma Delta Chi Awards from the Society of Professional Journalists: two to cartoonist Mr. Fish (Dwayne Booth) in 2009 and 2010, and one to Robert Scheer for "Online Column Writing (Independent)" in 2011.

Work stoppage and relaunch 
On March 11, 2020, nine employees of Truthdig signed a statement announcing a work stoppage "to protest what they describe as unfair labor conditions and the effort by the publisher, Zuade Kaufman, to remove the site's founding Editor-in-Chief and co-owner Robert Scheer." On March 27, Kaufman responded in an open letter that attributed the matter to "negotiations to end the business partnership" between herself and Scheer. On March 25, Truthdig employees were emailed to the effect that "Truthdig LLC was being dissolved and that our positions at the publication had been terminated." According to the statement, 15 employees would be affected. The Truthdig website concomitantly posted an announcement that Truthdig was "going on a hiatus". On November 1, 2022, the website relaunched without Scheer's involvement.

See also 
 Independent media
 Watchdog journalism

References

External links 
 
 Truthdig on YouTube.com

American news websites
Broadcasting websites
Citizen journalism
Internet properties established in 2005
Investigative journalism
Media analysis organizations and websites
News agencies based in the United States
Mass media in Los Angeles
Webby Award winners